Louis William may refer to:

 Louis William, Margrave of Baden-Baden (1655–1707)
 Louis William, Landgrave of Hesse-Homburg (1770–1839)

See also